"White Punks on Dope", abbreviated as "WPOD", is a 1975 song by San Francisco-based rock group The Tubes from their debut album, produced by Al Kooper. The song was written by the band's dual lead guitarists, Bill Spooner and Roger Steen with Michael Evans. It has been called “absurd anthem of wretched excess,” ridiculing the rich and famous offspring of Hollywood elite. The song became the group's rock anthem and spectacular closing number to their elaborate stage shows. The band developed a cult-like fan base that has followed them for decades.

Known for frequent costume changes, the group's lead singer Fee Waybill plays the character of Quay Lewd, a take off on Quaalude, a drugged out British rock star wearing two-foot tall platform shoes, a feather boa and a long blonde wig. In his early career as a choreographer, Kenny Ortega would add elements to try to make every show more spectacular.  There were explosions, smoke, chainsaws and a daredevil aerial artist.  Among the barely-dressed dancers and characters were Jane Dornacker and Pearl E. Gates.  Even up and coming local actor/comedian Robin Williams auditioned for the show.

While it was considered too racy to receive much airplay in the United States, two years later the single reached #28 on the British charts.

Cover versions

 Mötley Crüe covered "White Punks on Dope" on their album New Tattoo, and performs it live in concert on their Lewd, Crüed, & Tattooed DVD.
 Nina Hagen Band interpreted the song in a German-language version, translated to "TV-Glotzer" (with re-written lyrics about being an East German who lives vicariously by staring at West German television all day) on their self-titled debut album in 1978.

References

External links

1975 songs
The Tubes songs
Song recordings produced by Al Kooper